Gynoroentgenology is the abbreviation of gynecological roentgenology. It is the radiologic imaging of the gynecologic parts of the female human body in order to make a radiologic diagnosis of a gynecologic disease.  The term gynecologic radiology is related to gynoroentgenology.  Gynoroentgenologic imaging can detect and diagnose primary neoplasms, metastasis, therapy-related lesions, congenital lesions, inflammation, miscellaneous diseases, pseudolesions, normal variants, infection uterine arteriovenous malformations and cystic adenomyosis.  An example procedure is gynography.

See also
Gynecologic ultrasonography
Gynography

References

Allen, Jr., WM. E. Diagnostic Roentgenology in Obstetrics and Gynecology, A Review of Basic Considerations, JOURNAL OF THE NATIONAL MEDICAL ASSOCIATION JANUARY, 1953, pp. 38-45
Peterson, Reuben. Pneumoperitoneum and Roentgenology as Aids to More Accurate Obstetrics and Gynecologic Diagnosis, American Gynecological Society

Further reading
Stein, Irving F. and Robert A. Arens. Visualization of the Pelvic Viscera Iodized Oil and Pneumoperitoneum Combined in Gynecology, Radiology

Female genital procedures
Projectional radiography